Crina is a Romanian female given name. Notable people with the name include:

Crina Georgescu (born 1960), Romanian volleyball player
Crina Pintea (born 1990), Romanian handball player
Crina Violeta Serediuc (born 1971), Romanian rower

See also
Rina (given name)

Romanian feminine given names